Drosanthemum ("dewflowers") is a genus of succulent plants in the ice plant family native to the winter-rainfall regions of southern Africa. Most species bear colorful flowers.

The name Drosanthemum means "dew-flower" in Greek, and refers to the characteristic shiny translucent papillae, which cover the succulent leaves and flower buds.

Species
Species include:
Drosanthemum acutifolium (L.Bolus) L.Bolus
Drosanthemum bicolor L.Bolus
Drosanthemum eburneum L.Bolus
Drosanthemum flammeum L.Bolus
Drosanthemum floribundum (Haw.) Schwantes, syn. D. candens (Haw.) Schwantes
Drosanthemum hispidum (L.) Schwantes
Drosanthemum lavisii L.Bolus
Drosanthemum lique (N.E.Br.) Schwantes 
Drosanthemum micans (L.) Schwantes
Drosanthemum paxianum (Schltr. & Diels) Schwantes
Drosanthemum praecultum (N.E.Br.) Schwantes 
Drosanthemum quadratum Klak
Drosanthemum schoenlandianum (Schltr.) L.Bolus
Drosanthemum speciosum (Haw.) Schwantes

References

External links

Jepson Manual Treatment
Flora of North America: Genus Profile

 
Aizoaceae genera
Succulent plants